This is a list of people from Denmark notable for their involvement in sports or athletics.

Badminton
 Morten Frost, men's single, All England master 1982, 1984, 1986, and 1987
 Peter Gade, men's single, All England master 1999
 Lene Køppen, women's single, World champion 1977, All England master 1979
 Poul-Erik Høyer Larsen, men's single, 1996 Olympic gold
 Camilla Martin, women's single, World champion 1999, All England master 2002
 Svend Pri, men's single, All England master 1975
 Alfa Tofft (1911–2004), pioneering female player, founder of Aarhus Badmintonklub

Bicycle racing
 Kim Andersen, road bicycle racing
 Thorvald Ellegaard, track cycling, six-fold world professional champion in sprint
 Niels Fredborg, track cycling, Olympic gold medalist 1972
 Lasse Norman Hansen, track cycling, Olympic gold medalist 2012
 Michael Rasmussen, road bicycle racing, King of the Mountains in the 2005 and 2006 Tour de France
 Bjarne Riis, road bicycle racing, Tour de France winner 1996
 Ole Ritter, road bicycle racing, two silver medals at the world championship
 Jesper Skibby, road bicycle racing
 Rolf Sørensen, road bicycle racing, Olympic silver medalist 1996
 Jakob Fuglsang
 Michael Valgren
 Jonas Vingegaard, road bicycle racing, Tour de France winner 2022

Boxing 

 Mikkel Kessler, boxer
 Brian Nielsen, boxer

Cricket 

Christo Botma

Fencing
Ivan Osiier, épée, foil, and sabre fencer, Olympic silver (épée), 25-time Danish champion
Ellen Osiier (1890–1962), Olympic fencing foil champion

Football

Daniel Agger, defender, Brøndby IF 2004–2006, 2014–present; Liverpool F.C. 2006–2014
Mads Hamberg Andersen
Preben Arentoft, Greenock Morton, Newcastle United F.C., Blackburn Rovers F.C.
Martin Arlofelt, defender
Frank Arnesen
Simon Bahne Backmann
Lars Bastrup
Nicklas Bendtner, Arsenal F.C. 2006–2014; VfL Wolfsburg, 2014-present
Kresten Bjerre
Per Bjerregaard
Harald Bohr (1887–1951), Olympic silver medalist and mathematician; brother of Niels Bohr
Tonny Brogaard, goalkeeper
Charles Buchwald, Olympic two-time silver medalist
Henrik Bundgaard, goalkeeper
Frederik Christensen
Nick Christensen, forward
Tochi Chukwuani
Sebastian Denius
Preben Elkjær
Christian Eriksen
Martin Fisch
Dalibor Gotovac, defender
Thomas Gravesen
Jacob Gregersen
Jesper Grønkjær
Morten Hamm
John Hansen (born 1924)
Johnny Hansen (born 1943)
Karl Aage Hansen
Ronni Hansen, midfielder 
Thomas Helveg
Casper Hyltoft
Henning Jensen
John Jensen
Martin Jørgensen
Pauli Jørgensen
Gökcan Kaya
Simon Kjær
Kasper Køhlert
Nicolaj Køhlert
Brian Laudrup, forward, Rangers F.C. 1994–1998; Euro 92
Finn Laudrup
Michael Laudrup, Juventus F.C. 1985–1989; FC Barcelona 1989–1994
Martin Laursen
Søren Lerby
Marianne Løvendorf, defender
Knud Lundberg
Ole Madsen
Nils Middelboe
Kim Milton Nielsen referee
Klaus Moesgaard
Jan Mølby, player and manager
Richard Møller Nielsen
Allan Nielsen
Harald Nielsen
Casper Olesen
Jesper Olsen
Lars Olsen
Morten Olsen, player and coach
Flemming Østergaard
Gitte Pedersen
Christian Poulsen
Roald Poulsen
Flemming Povlsen
Carl Aage Præst
Erik Rasmussen
Thomas Rohde
Dennis Rommedahl
Per Røntved
Ebbe Sand
Kasper Schmeichel
Peter Schmeichel, goalkeeper, Manchester United 1991–1999; Euro 92, CL98/99
Rang Shawkat, defender
Allan Simonsen, 1977 European Footballer of the Year
Emilio Simonsen
Ebbe Skovdahl, manager, most notable for popularity at Aberdeen football club
Jørgen Leschly Sørensen
Thomas Sørensen, goalkeeper, Stoke City
Jon Dahl Tomasson, forward, A.C. Milan 2003–2005, VfB Stuttgart 2005–, UEFA Cup 2002
Stig Tøfting
Simon Trier
Kim Vilfort
Michael Zacho

Handball
 Lars Agersted, right winger
 Anja Andersen, handball player; 1996 Olympic gold 
 Anders Christensen, right winger
 Morten Stig Christensen, handball player turned TV host
 Mikael Fruelund, right back
 Kristian Gjessing, left back
 Simon Hammer, left winger
 Michael Sahl Hansen, playmaker and line player
 Mikkel Hansen, left back
 Anne Hykkelbjerg, line player
 Claus Kjeldgaard, centre back
 Simon Krogh, playmaker
 Sascha Juul, left winger
 Pelle Larsen, line player
 Nikoline Nielsen, left back
 Stefan Nielsen, left winger
 Jesper Storm, line player

Ice hockey
 Frederik Andersen, first Danish-born goalie to play in the NHL
 Mikkel Bødker, highest drafted (8th overall) Danish-born player
 Lars Eller, ice hockey player
 Jannik Hansen, first Danish citizen to play and register a goal in an NHL playoff game
 Philip Larsen, first Danish-born defenseman to play in the NHL
 Frans Nielsen, first Danish citizen to play in the NHL
 Poul Popiel, first Danish-born to play in the NHL
 Peter Regin, ice hockey player

Motorsports

Automobile racing 

Michael Christensen, Porscheworks driver
Casper Elgaard, 24 Hours of Le Mans driver
Nicolas Kiesa, Formula One driver
Tom Kristensen, only driver to win 24 Hours of Le Mans nine times (1997, 2000, 2001, 2002, 2003, 2004, 2005, 2008, 2013)
Jan Magnussen, Formula One driver
Kevin Magnussen, Formula One driver

Motorcycle speedway 

Hans Andersen
Kenneth Bjerre
Erik Gundersen, three-time Speedway World Champion (1984, 1985, 1988)
Hans Nielsen, four-time World Champion (1986, 1987, 1989, 1995); won the inaugural Speedway Grand Prix series in 1995
Ole Olsen, three-time World Champion (1971, 1975, 1978); first Dane to win the Speedway World Championship
Bjarne Pedersen
Jan O. Pedersen, 1991 Speedway World Champion
Nicki Pedersen, two-time World Champion (2007, 2008)
Jonas Raun

Rowing and sailing
 Jesper Bank, sailing 1992, 2000 Summer Olympics gold
 Eskild Ebbesen, gold medalist in rowing
 Paul Elvstrøm, sailing, 1948, 1952, 1956, 1960 Olympic gold

Tennis
 Kenneth Carlsen, No. 43 in men's singles in 1993
 Frederik Løchte Nielsen, winner of Wimbledon 2012 Gentlemen's Doubles
 Caroline Wozniacki, No. 1 in women's singles in 2010

Wrestling 

 Leo Cortsen, Greco-Roman wrestler, appeared at the 1952 Summer Olympics
Abraham Kurland (1912–1999), Greco-Roman wrestler, silver medalist at the 1932 Summer Olympics
 Carl Nelson, Greco-Roman wrestler, European welterweight champion

Other
 Morten Andersen, American football, 2nd most points and field goals ever in the NFL
 Chanan Colman (born 1984), Danish-Israeli professional basketball player for the Copenhagen Wolfpack of the Danish Basketligaen
Peter Eastgate, World Series of Poker main event champion
 Rune Glifberg, professional skateboarder
 Helle Gotved (1912–2006), developed a new approach to gymnastics
 Gus Hansen, high-stakes poker player
 Niels Holst-Sørensen, European champion athlete and commander-in-chief of the Royal Danish Air Force
 Martin Kampmann, mixed martial artist
 Oliver Venndt Kaszas, beach volleyball player
 Bent Larsen, 1956 International Grandmaster in chess
 Ole Laursen, kickboxer
 Gunnar Nielsen, runner; former world record holder over 1500 metres
 Nicholas Pettas, kickboxer
 Mikael Lai Rasmussen, rugby union player
 Pernille Svarre, pentathlonist
 Helle Trevino, IFBB professional bodybuilder

See also 
 Lists of sportspeople

References 

Sport
Danish